Barry Engelbrecht (8 September 1924 – November 1982) was a South African weightlifter. He competed in the men's lightweight event at the 1952 Summer Olympics.

Weight Classes Competed in: Featherweight (60KG), Lightweight (67.5KG),

References

External links
 

1924 births
1982 deaths
South African male weightlifters
Olympic weightlifters of South Africa
Weightlifters at the 1952 Summer Olympics
Sportspeople from Kimberley, Northern Cape
Commonwealth Games bronze medallists for South Africa
Commonwealth Games medallists in weightlifting
Weightlifters at the 1950 British Empire Games
20th-century South African people
Medallists at the 1950 British Empire Games